Abdulaziz Majrashi may refer to:
 Abdulaziz Majrashi (footballer, born 1991), Saudi Arabian footballer
 Abdulaziz Majrashi (footballer, born 1996), Saudi Arabian footballer